Antoninus Liberalis was an Ancient Greek grammarian who probably flourished between AD 100 and 300.

Work 
His only surviving work is the Metamorphoses (Μεταμορφώσεων Συναγωγή, Metamorphoseon Synagoge, literally "Collection of Transformations"), a collection of forty-one very briefly summarised tales about mythical metamorphoses effected by offended deities, unique in that they are couched in prose, not verse. The literary genre of myths of transformations of men and women, heroes and nymphs, into stars (see Catasterismi), plants and animals, or springs,  rocks and mountains, were widespread and popular in the classical world. This work has more polished parallels in the better-known Metamorphoses of Ovid and in the Metamorphoses of Lucius Apuleius. Like them, its sources, where they can be traced, are Hellenistic works, such as Nicander's Heteroeumena and  Ornithogonia ascribed to Boios.

The work survives in a single manuscript, of the later 9th century, now in the Palatine Library in Heidelberg; it contains several works. John of Ragusa brought it to the Dominican convent at Basel about 1437; in 1553, Hieronymus Froeben gave it to Otto Henry, Elector Palatine, who gave it to the Library. In 1623, with the rest of the Palatine Library, it was taken to Rome; in 1798, to Paris, as part of Napoleonic plunder under the terms of the Treaty of Tolentino; in 1816, it was restored to Heidelberg.

Guilielmus Xylander printed the text in 1568; since some leaves have since disappeared, his edition is also a necessary authority for the text.

Many of the transformations in this compilation are found nowhere else, and some may simply be inventions of Antoninus. The manner of the narrative is a laconic and conversational prose: "this completely inartistic text," as Sarah Myers called it, offers the briefest summaries of lost metamorphoses by more ambitious writers, such as Nicander and Boeus. Francis Celoria, the translator, regards the text as perfectly acceptable koine Greek, though with numerous hapax legomena; it is "grimly simple" and mostly devoid of grammatical particles which would convey humor or a narratorial persona.

Tales 

 Ctesylla
 The Meleagrids
 Hierax
 Cragaleus
 Aegypius
 Periphas
 Anthus
 Lamia or Sybaris
 Emathides
 Minyades
 Aëdon or Nightingale
 Cycnus or Swan
 Aspalis
 Munichus
 Meropis
 Oenoe
 Leucippus
 Eeropus or Bee-eater
 The Thieves
 Clinis
 Polyphonte
 Cerambus
 Battus
 Ascalabus
 Metioche and Menippe
 Hylas
 Iphigeneia
 Typhon
 Galinthias
 Byblis
 The Messapians
 Dryope
 Alcmene
 Smyrna
 The Herdsmen
 Pandareus
 The Dorians
 Wolf
 Arceophon
 Britomartis
 The Fox

Footnotes

Notes

References 

Celoria, Francis, ed. and trans. The Metamorphoses of Antoninus Liberalis: A Translation With Commentary, trans. (London and New York: Routledge) 1992. English with  comparative notes. . This, not offering the Greek text,  is the first English translation of this work.

Irving, Forbes. Metamorphosis in Greek Myth
Papathomopoulos, Manolis. Antoninus Liberalis: Les Métamorphoses (Paris, Budé, 1968) First translation into French; extensive notes and indices, except on linguistic questions; probably at present the standard text.
Trzaskoma, Stephen M.. Antoninus Liberalis: three sections from Metamorphoses'': Hierax; Aigypios; The Dorians

Ancient Greek grammarians
Shapeshifting
Texts in Koine Greek